The tubenose poacher (Pallasina barbata) is a species of poacher native to the northern Pacific Ocean. This species grows to a length of  TL. This species is the only known member of its genus.

References
 

Brachyopsinae
Monotypic fish genera
Fish described in 1876